Agrotis arenivolans is a moth of the family Noctuidae. It is endemic to Maui, East Maui and Hawaii.

External links
Organisms of Hawaii

Agrotis
Moths described in 1879
Endemic moths of Hawaii